Ibrahim Sina was an Albanian politician and mayor of Tirana from 1947 through 1949 and 1954 through 1955.

References

Year of birth missing
Year of death missing
Mayors of Tirana